Ethiopiaid is a UK-registered charity that generates public funding for local charity partners in Ethiopia. It supports organisations who work in poverty reduction, healthcare, empowerment of women & girls, elder support, children with disabilities, surgery for facial disfigurements and educational access.

History 
Ethiopiaid was founded in 1989 by Sir Alec Reed. Reed is the founder of Reed (Company) along with several international charities and charitable website the Big Give. Sir Alec established the charity after a visit to Ethiopia in the late 1980s.'

Fundraising 
Ethiopiaid raises money through regular postal campaigns, containing updates on partner development and opportunities to support their work.

Operations 

Ethiopiaid’s stated aim is to support local organisations to use their initiative and skill to improve living conditions in the country.

The organisation is headquartered in Bath, England, using offices donated by Reed. The UK office is run by a team of five, along with one further volunteers.

For the financial year ending December 2017, the charity reported income of £2.4m and expenditure of £3.2m, of which £2.94m was spent directly on  charitable activities.

Ethiopiaid works with partners rather than specific projects or programmes. These local charities take on funding twice a year, based on an annual review of accounts by Ethiopiaid.

Maternal health
Ethiopiaid’s partners work in support of mothers affected by obstetric fistula, a medical condition arising from prolonged pregnancy, where the pressure of the baby's head causes a hole between the woman's bladder and her vagina. If left untreated, the condition can cause incontinence. The Hamlin Fistula Hospital provides pre- and post-operative care for women affected by this condition, including life-saving operations and training for midwives - with the students being past patients of the hospital.

Poverty Reduction 
Ethiopiaid's partners seek to relieve poverty by working with local Ethiopian organisations, including the Destitute Elders Development Association (DEWADA), which provides food, clothing, medicine and house repairs to impoverished elderly men and women.

Education 
The Hope College of Business, Science and Technology opened in 2012 as Ethiopia's first not-for-profit liberal arts university college; Ehiopiaid has supported the college since inception. Hope Enterprises seeks to advance education in Ethiopia by giving citizens the knowledge and expertise needed to work themselves out of poverty.

Disability and destructive diseases 

Ethiopiaid works with Cheshire Services in Addis Ababa to help disabled children and adults. It also works with Facing Africa who work in support of people affected by noma, a gangrenous disease which can result in severe and painful facial wounds. Facing Africa arrange bi-annual 2 week missions of European surgeons, doctors, anaesthetists and nurses to correct these disfigurements, operating on around 35-40 patients per mission.

Emergency Funding 
Ethiopiaid has conducted relief campaigns by partnering with larger NGOs to raise funding for those affected by drought or famine. It raised £185,000 in public fundraising and granted around £460,000 to local partners as part of the 2016 emergency drought relief effort.

References

External links

Destitute Elders Development Association (DEWADA)
HopeUniversity College

Development charities based in the United Kingdom
Foreign charities operating in Ethiopia
Droughts in Africa
21st-century droughts
Natural disasters in Ethiopia